Bente Skari, née Martinsen, (born 10 September 1972) is a Norwegian former cross-country skier. She is one of the most successful cross-country skiers ever.

Career
She won her first Olympic medals in 1998, and won her first gold medal in the 2002 Winter Olympics, coming from behind to beat the favourites Olga Danilova and Julija Tchepalova in the last kilometers of the 10 km classical event. She also won a bronze medal in 30 km classical as well as a silver medal in the relay.

Additionally, she won five gold medals (5 km: 1999, 10 km: 2001, 2003, and 15 km: 2001, 2003) from the FIS Nordic World Ski Championships, as well as two silver (4 × 5 km relay: 1997, 2001) medals. She won the overall cross-country skiing World Cup four times before retiring after the 2003 season.

Skari also won the women's 30 km event at the Holmenkollen ski festival in 2003. In 2001, she received the Holmenkollen medal (shared with Adam Małysz and Thomas Alsgaard). Her father, Odd Martinsen, earned the Holmenkollen medal in 1969. They are the only father-daughter combination to ever win this prestigious honour.

In 1998, she won Tjejvasan.

After retirement
In 2007, Skari was named as the first female race administrator in cross-country skiing. She assisted in the 2007-08 Tour de Ski, working as an assistant technical delegate in the events held in the Czech Republic. This is part of the Norwegian Ski Federation's effort to promote more women in management positions in skiing.

Cross-country skiing results
All results are sourced from the International Ski Federation (FIS).

Olympic Games
 5 medals – (1 gold, 2 silver, 2 bronze)

World Championships
 7 medals – (5 gold, 2 silver)

a.  Cancelled due to extremely cold weather.

World Cup

Season titles
 9 titles – (4 overall, 5 sprint)

Season standings

a.  5th in the Long Distance World Cup.     6th in the Middle Distance World Cup.

Individual podiums
 42 victories  
 60 podiums

Team podiums
5 victories – (4  , 1 ) 
23 podiums – (22  , 1 ) 

Note:  Until the 1999 World Championships, World Championship races were included in the World Cup scoring system.

Overall record

a.  Classification is made according to FIS classification.
b.  Includes individual and mass start races.
c.  Includes pursuit and double pursuit races.
d.  May be incomplete due to lack of appropriate sources for some relay races prior to 1995/96 World Cup season.

Note: Until 1999 World Championships and 1994 Olympics, World Championship and Olympic races are part of the World Cup. Hence results from those races are included in the World Cup overall record.

Personal life
Bente Skari was named Martinsen before marrying Geir Skari in 1999. She is the mother of three children, Filip, Oda and Selma.

References
 
 FIS Nordic World Ski Championships 2011 February 12, 2008 article on Skari's role in the championships. - accessed March 12, 2008.
 Holmenkollen medalists - click Holmenkollmedaljen for downloadable pdf file 
 Holmenkollen winners since 1892 - click Vinnere for downloadable pdf file 

Notes

1972 births
Living people
Holmenkollen medalists
Holmenkollen Ski Festival winners
Norwegian female cross-country skiers
Cross-country skiers at the 1994 Winter Olympics
Cross-country skiers at the 1998 Winter Olympics
Cross-country skiers at the 2002 Winter Olympics
Olympic cross-country skiers of Norway
Olympic gold medalists for Norway
Olympic silver medalists for Norway
Olympic bronze medalists for Norway
People from Nittedal
Olympic medalists in cross-country skiing
FIS Nordic World Ski Championships medalists in cross-country skiing
FIS Cross-Country World Cup champions
Medalists at the 2002 Winter Olympics
Medalists at the 1998 Winter Olympics
Sportspeople from Viken (county)